WIXX (101.1 FM) is a Top 40/CHR radio station licensed to and serving Green Bay, Wisconsin, along with Appleton, Oshkosh, and much of Northeast Wisconsin.  The station is owned and operated by Wausau, Wisconsin-based Midwest Communications, and is part of a Midwest-owned cluster of 8 stations in the market.  WIXX broadcasts from studios located on Bellevue Street in the Green Bay suburb of Bellevue, and transmits from a tower on Scray Hill in the Brown County town of Ledgeview, sharing a site with WBAY-TV, WPNE-TV, and WPNE-FM. WIXX's main competition comes from WKSZ/WKZY, a Top 40 (CHR) simulcast broadcasting to the same area.

History

The station, with the original call letters WJPG-FM, was owned by the Green Bay Press-Gazette to complement their then-owned station WJPG (now WNFL). WJPG-FM began broadcasting August 13, 1947, though there is no record of the Press-Gazette regularly broadcasting on the FM signal.  Eventually, the Press-Gazette would sell WJPG-FM to the Norbertine Order of Priests, a De Pere-based religious order that founded St. Norbert College.  The well-financed Norbertines were interested in complementing their existing stations in the Green Bay market, WBAY radio (AM 1360) and WBAY-TV (channel 2).  WJPG-FM would eventually become WBAY-FM, and for many years would air easy-listening and middle-of-the-road music formats.

By the mid-1970s, the Norbertine Order would sell its broadcast holdings, with WBAY-AM-FM being sold to what would become Midwest Communications.  On September 1, 1975, the radio stations would be given new call signs; the AM would become WGEE, while WBAY-FM would take on the WIXX calls.  The story of the WIXX call sign has been unclear; though it was believed to be part of a "gee whiz" pun with WGEE, Midwest Communications head Duke Wright has been somewhat coy, stating in 2007 that he was into "X"s and "Z"s back then and WIXX sounds "better than 'WIZZ'".  Even after their split in 1975, the radio and TV stations would continue to be housed at 115 South Jefferson Street in downtown Green Bay until 2008, when WIXX, WTAQ (which flipped back to its original callsign from WGEE in 2003), and their Midwest sister stations would move to new facilities in Bellevue, next to the transmitter facility of Midwest-owned WNFL. (WBAY-TV remains at South Jefferson to this day.)

By the time the Norbertines sold WIXX, the station had adopted an Album-Oriented Rock (AOR) format.  That format was dropped on February 12, 1977, when, in a move that was met with protest by fans of the AOR format, WIXX adopted the Top 40/CHR format that continues to this day.  Though initially going automated as a Top 40 station, WIXX would gradually add live dayparts, including in mornings, and would become a fully live station by the mid-1980s.

Today, WIXX is regarded as a heritage Top 40 station, thanks in part to its longevity in the format, its connections with its audience through round-the-clock staffing and local music surveys, and its flexibility to introduce new music to listeners as well as incorporating modern rock and Hot AC music into the playlist.  It has resulted in honors for the station, including the 2007 Station of the Year Award in the CHR/Top 40 category for market size 101–250 at the national Radio & Records convention.  WIXX also benefits from the long reach of its 101.1 FM signal, which can be regularly received as far north as Michigan's Upper Peninsula and as far south as Milwaukee. They take advantage of that coverage whenever tornado warnings are issued by broadcasting continuous coverage on all of its sister stations.

Current on-air staff

The below list reflects the WIXX air staff as of September 6, 2018.  In addition to their roles on the station, Midwest Communications also voicetracks several WIXX personalities on WTBX-FM in Hibbing, Minnesota, KDKE in Duluth, Minnesota, and WXER Sheboygan. WTBX and WXER air Hot AC formats, while KDKE is country.

Weekdays
 Biff(Overnights & The All Night Party)
 Murphy in the Morning Show w/ Katie & Nick
 Corey Carter(9 AM-10 AM)
 Fife(10 AM-2 PM)
 Huggie(2 PM-6 PM)
 Jayson Slade(6 PM-11 PM)

Weekends & Fill-ins
 Tom Pederson(Overnights)
 Casey Jones
 Jerry Michaels
 Shane Reno
 Aaron
 Alex Mason
 Andy Gardner
 Andrew Haze
 Abby Sylvia
 Rick Styles

Additionally, WIXX is also part of the Packers Radio Network, broadcasting Green Bay Packers games alongside sister stations WTAQ AM/FM.

References

External links

Midwest Communications
Click here to view a virtual tour of Midwest Communications' new building

IXX
Contemporary hit radio stations in the United States
Radio stations established in 1950
1950 establishments in Wisconsin
Midwest Communications radio stations